Calvary is a 1920 British silent drama film directed by Edwin J. Collins and starring Malvina Longfellow, Henry Victor and Charles Vane.

Cast
 Malvina Longfellow as Lady Pamela Stevenage  
 Henry Victor as David Penryn  
 Charles Vane as Lord Stevenage  
 Dorothy Moody as Ruth Penryn  
 Wallace Bosco as Reuben Leaffel  
 James F. Henry as Stephen Ormiston  
 Barbara Everest as Rachel Penryn  
 E.F. Wallace as Mr. Penryn  
 George Goodwin  as Squire Craddock

References

Bibliography
 Palmer, Scott. British Film Actors' Credits, 1895-1987. McFarland, 1998.

External links

 

1920 films
1920 drama films
British drama films
British silent feature films
Films directed by Edwin J. Collins
Films set in Cornwall
British black-and-white films
1920s English-language films
1920s British films
Silent drama films